Sean Foudy (born October 25, 1966) is a former Canadian football defensive back who played six seasons in the Canadian Football League (CFL) with the Ottawa Rough Riders and BC Lions. He was drafted by the Rough Riders in the third round of the 1989 CFL Draft. He played CIS football at York University.

College career
Foudy participated in football and track for the York Lions from 1986 to 1991. He helped the track team win silver and bronze team medals at the national championships and, individually, he won four CIAU and five OUAA medals in the 60m hurdles and relays. He also earned second-team all-star honors in football in 1988. Foudy was named York’s male athlete of the year in 1989 and was inducted into the York University Sport Hall of Fame in 2006.

Professional career
Foudy was selected by the Ottawa Rough Riders of the CFL with the 17th pick in the 1989 CFL Draft. He played for the Rough Riders from 1989 to 1992. He played for the CFL's BC Lions from 1993 to 1994, winning the 82nd Grey Cup in 1994. Foudy retired in 1994 after only playing in 13 regular season games the previous two years due to injuries, including seven shoulder dislocations.

Coaching career
Foudy became special teams coordinator of the York Lions in 2014.

Personal life
Foudy is married to former sprinter France Gareau. His son Liam, an ice hockey player, was drafted 18th overall by the Columbus Blue Jackets in the 2018 NHL Entry Draft. Jean-Luc was selected in the third round of the 2020 NHL Entry Draft by the Colorado Avalanche.

References

External links
Just Sports Stats

Living people
1966 births
Players of Canadian football from Ontario
Canadian football defensive backs
York Lions football players
Ottawa Rough Riders players
BC Lions players
Canadian football people from Toronto